18-Hydroxycortisol is an endogenous steroid.

Function
18-hydroxycortisol has been proposed as a biomarker for certain diseases. In humans, 18-hydroxycortisol has no biological activity on glucocorticoid or mineralocorticoid receptors. In healthy subjects, the biosynthesis of 18-hydroxycortisol is low. The highest synthesis of 18-hydroxycortisol was found in certain cases of hypertension like in type 1 familial hyperaldosteronism (glucocorticoid-curable hyperaldosteronism) and type 3 familial hyperaldosteronism, where the adrenal glands are enlarged up to six times their normal size. Increased synthesis is also found in patients with aldosterone-producing adenomas. ACTH stimulation test increases urinary excretion of 18-hydroxycortisol, and dexamethasone inhibits the excretion.

See also
 Cortisol
 18-Hydroxycorticosterone
 Aldosterone synthase
 Steroid 11β-hydroxylase
 6β-Hydroxycortisol

References

Steroids